Manuel Franquelo (born in Málaga 1953) is a Spanish painter and mixed media sculptor.

Franquelo established his reputation as a hyper-realist painter. A common theme in his paintings are a collection of still life objects arranged on a shelf against a dark background.

From the late 1990s Franquelo has worked and collaborated with Adam Lowe and engineer Sven Nebel. Lowe and Franquelo created the Factum Arte studio together in 2001, and Franquelo was involved with the studio until 2004. With the support of Factum Arte and Factum Foundation, Franquelo created the Lucida 3D Scanner, used to record low-relief surfaces such as those of paintings and frescoed wall surfaces in 3D, and still in use by Factum in 2020. Franquelo trained as an electronic engineer, and now produces installations and sculptures often incorporating electronics or computer control.

In 2001, Franquelo and Lowe contributed to a project, along with the Egyptian Supreme Council of Antiquities, Dr Ahmad Baghat and Michael Mallinson, to demonstrate that it was possible to laser-scan and replicate the tomb of Seti I in the Valley of the Kings. This led to the later recording by Factum Arte and Factum Foundation of the Tomb of Thutmose III, the tomb of Tutankhamun, and the tomb of Seti I.

References

External links
Untitled (1985)
The Cultural Chorus (1999), 3 platforms with 12 microprocessor-driven electronic circuits which pose random questions from a generated vocabulary and answer in chorus.
Preacher and the Chorus (1999) as part of Noise.
Prints at Marlborough Fine Art
 (in Spanish) Interview in "El Mundo" newspaper

1950 births
Living people
Spanish installation artists
20th-century Spanish painters
20th-century Spanish male artists
Spanish male painters
21st-century Spanish painters
21st-century Spanish male artists